The crested spinetail (Cranioleuca subcristata) is a species of bird in the family Furnariidae in northern South America. It is found in Colombia and Venezuela. Its natural habitats are subtropical or tropical moist lowland forest and subtropical or tropical moist montane forest. The species inhabits a wide variety of forest and scrub habitats below 1500 meters in elevation.

References

crested spinetail
Birds of Colombia
Birds of Venezuela
crested spinetail
crested spinetail
Taxonomy articles created by Polbot